Charles Osgood (1809–1890) was an American artist from Salem, Massachusetts, who also worked briefly in Boston and New York City. Examples of his work are in the American Antiquarian Society, Historic New England, Harvard University, Massachusetts Historical Society, and Peabody Essex Museum.

References

Further reading
 Frederic Alan Sharf. "Charles Osgood : the life and times of a Salem portrait painter." Essex Institute Historical Collections, vol. 102, no. 3 (July 1966).
 Charles Osgood.  Essex Institute catalog, special loan exhibition (Nov. 1978 - Jan 1979).  Essex Institute, Salem, MA

External links

 WorldCat. Osgood, Charles 1809-1890
 White Mountain Art & Artists. Charles Osgood (1809-1890)

1809 births
1890 deaths
Artists from Salem, Massachusetts
American portrait painters
Painters from Massachusetts
19th-century American painters
19th-century male artists